Edgar Lee Walker (March 25, 1901 – June 16, 1972) was an American football player, coach of football and basketball, and college athletics administrator. He served as the head football coach at the University of Mississippi (Ole Miss) from 1930 to 1937, compiling a record of 38–38–8. Walker was also the head basketball coach at Ole Miss from 1930 to 1935, tallying a mark of 46–36.

Head coaching record

Football

References

External links
 

1901 births
1972 deaths
American football ends
American football halfbacks
Basketball coaches from Louisiana
Columbia Lions football coaches
Ole Miss Rebels athletic directors
Ole Miss Rebels football coaches
Ole Miss Rebels men's basketball coaches
Stanford Cardinal football coaches
Stanford Cardinal football players
People from Jonesboro, Louisiana